Dyspessa delrei is a species of moth of the family Cossidae. It is found in Libya.

References

Moths described in 1936
Dyspessa
Moths of Africa